Mount Pleasant Methodist Episcopal Church and Parsonage is a historic Methodist Episcopal church and parsonage located at Wilmington, New Castle County, Delaware. It was built in 1838, and is a one-story, stuccoed stone structure with a gable roof.  It measures approximately 50 feet by 40 feet, and has a gable-roofed vestibule added in 1893.  Adjacent to the church is the parsonage built in 1894.  It is a -story, four-bay L-shaped frame dwelling in the Queen Anne style.  It sits on a fieldstone foundation and features gray-green fish-scale shingles.  Adjacent is the contributing church cemetery with burials dating back to 1841.

It was added to the National Register of Historic Places in 1998. It is now part of Bellevue State Park, a Delaware state park.

References

External links
 

Methodist churches in Delaware
Queen Anne architecture in Delaware
Churches completed in 1838
19th-century Methodist church buildings in the United States
Churches in Wilmington, Delaware
Churches on the National Register of Historic Places in Delaware
National Register of Historic Places in Wilmington, Delaware
Cemeteries on the National Register of Historic Places in Delaware